Sergei Gennadyevich Karasev (born 12 June 1979) is a Russian international referee.

Refereeing career
Karasev became a FIFA referee in 2010. He has refereed at 2014 FIFA World Cup qualifiers, beginning with the Group A match between Scotland and Macedonia. At UEFA Euro 2020, he refereed three matches starting with Italy against Switzerland. In particular, he became the first Russian referee to be appointed to referee a World Cup or a UEFA Euro play-off match since 2008. He was often recognized as the best Russian referee.

Personal life
Karasev is married with two children. His primary hobby is attending metal concerts. In his interview for RIA Novosti, he names Slayer as his favourite metal band.

See also
List of football referees

 Sergei Karasev

References 

1979 births
Sportspeople from Moscow
Living people
Russian football referees
UEFA Euro 2016 referees
2018 FIFA World Cup referees
Football referees at the 2016 Summer Olympics
UEFA Euro 2020 referees